Blockchain.com (formerly Blockchain.info) is a cryptocurrency financial services company. The company began as the first Bitcoin blockchain explorer in 2011 and later created a cryptocurrency wallet that accounted for 28% of bitcoin transactions between 2012 and 2020. It also operates a cryptocurrency exchange and provides institutional markets lending business and data, charts, and analytics.

Corporate affairs
Blockchain.com is a private company. The company is led by CEO Peter Smith, one of its three founders. The company's board members include: Smith; co-founder Nicolas Cary; Antony Jenkins; Jim Messina, the former deputy chief of staff for Barack Obama, and Jeremy Liew, a partner at Lightspeed Venture Partners.

Between 2012 and February 2021, the company raised a total of $190 million in venture capital funding. In March 2021, it raised an additional $300 million investment. Investors in the company include partners of DST Global, Lightspeed Venture Partners, VY Capital, GV, Baillie Gifford, Lakestar, Eldridge, Kyle Bass, Access Industries, Moore Strategic Ventures and Rovida Advisors.

History
Blockchain.info was established by Ben Reeves in 2011. He launched a website which could be used to track bitcoin transactions. The website was a block explorer, a website that allowed bitcoin users to see the details of public cryptocurrency transactions if they have the identifying hash code for the transaction.

In early 2012, Reeves and Brian Armstrong, the co-founder of crypto-currency exchange Coinbase, applied to Y Combinator's summer class. They proposed a payment platform for bitcoin where users could keep a digital wallet, exchange other currency for bitcoins for a percentage fee, and make payments in bitcoin. Due to different opinions they parted ways prior to attending Y Combinator. Reeves wanted to create a platform where users controlled access to their bitcoin information, while Armstrong felt that the platform should retain custody of the users wallets. After parting ways with Armstrong, Reeves continued to work on Blockchain.info.

From 2013 to 2014, Blockchain's user base grew from 100,000 wallet users in early 2013 to 1.5 million in April 2014. By 2014, Blockchain.com was the most popular bitcoin wallet and was led by Nicolas Cary as CEO. It had acquired two companies, ZeroBlock in 2013, and RTBTC in early 2014, through which it added data analytics services, and brought these services together under one umbrella. In December 2013, Blockchain.com acquired ZeroBlock, an app for bitcoin pricing. The following year, it acquired the data analytics platform RTBTC. It integrated RTBTC's technology with its existing services, establishing one platform offering cryptocurrency wallet, pricing and analytics, and the cryptocurrency explorer.

In February 2014, Apple Inc. removed the Blockchain.com app from the iOS App Store, prompting a public outcry in the bitcoin community, most notably within the Reddit community. At the time, it was the only bitcoin wallet app available for Apple users, as Apple had removed or denied other apps. In July 2014, Apple reinstated the Blockchain.com app.

During 2014, Peter Smith joined the founding team as its CEO. The three founders, Reeves, Cary and Smith worked from Reeves' flat in York and formally established the company when bitcoin investor Roger Ver provided initial funding. By October 2014, it had 2.3 million consumer wallets and raised $30.5 million in its first external fundraising round, with investors including Lightspeed Venture Partners and Mosaic Ventures. This was the biggest round of financing in the digital currency sector at that time. The World Economic Forum named the company as one of 2016's "Technology Pioneers". In 2017, the company carried out a second round of fundraising. It closed $40 million in funding that June and the company was valued at $280 million.

In 2018, Blockchain started selling services for institutional cryptocurrency. In July 2019, Blockchain.com launched its cryptocurrency exchange, and promoted it as faster than others. In September 2020, the company joined the Coalition for App Fairness which aims to negotiate for better conditions for the inclusion of apps in app stores. In mid-2018, the company acquired Tsukemen, an app-development startup company based in San Francisco.

In 2020 the company had 31 million users and as of 2021, there were 65 million Blockchain.com wallets and 28% of bitcoin transactions since 2012 were initiated or received by a Blockchain.com wallet. In February 2021, Blockchain.com raised a $120 million funding round from investors including Moore Strategic Ventures, Kyle Bass, Access Industries, Rovida Advisors, Lightspeed Venture Partners, GV, Lakestar, and Eldridge. Including previous venture capital funding rounds, the company had raised $190 million altogether. One month later, the company announced a further $300 million fundraising round. One third of the amount raised was funded by investment firm Baillie Gifford which invested $100 million. Based on the fundraising round, the company was valued at $5.2 billion.

In 2022, Blockchain.com's CEO wrote to shareholders informing them that Three Arrows Capital rapidly becoming insolvent meant a default impact of approximately $270 million worth of cryptocurrency and US dollar loans to Blockchain.com. The firm laid off 25% of its staff, about 150 people, on July 21.

Products and services
As a cryptocurrency company, Blockchain.com provides a platform for holding, using, managing crypto assets, and exploring cryptocurrency transactions. It also develops financial services standards and infrastructure for cryptocurrencies. The company's platform provides market data and analytics. It follows cryptocurrency's aims of being decentralized and anonymous; some of its cryptocurrency products are managed by the end user and not accessible by Blockchain.com itself.

Its main products are its cryptocurrency wallet, exchange, block explorer, and institutional markets offering.

Wallet
The company offers a hosted cryptocurrency wallet which is a method to store cryptocurrency in a digital file that can be accessed online. The wallet can be used with different cryptocurrencies and stablecoins. Its wallets can be used to send and receive digital currency transactions, as well as swap between different cryptocurrencies. Blockchain.com has a non-custodial wallet, meaning that it is controlled completely by the user and the company has no access to the wallet's data. Users access their wallet with a private key, a recovery phrase known only to the user.

Exchange
A cryptocurrency exchange helps to convert your digital assets in money and money into the digital assets. They work like a stockbroker. The company has an exchange to allow its users to buy, sell, and trade cryptocurrencies. Additionally, the exchange's user interface can be customized by traders to show them relevant information depending on their level of experience.

Institutional markets business
In addition to its services for individuals, Blockchain.com also provides institutional investors with cryptocurrency-based financial services. The company's institutional markets business provides cryptocurrency lending, borrowing, trading and custody of financial assets. It also carries out over-the-counter transactions for large traders, acting as a broker to keep trades private and prevent price swings occurring based on market knowledge of the trades.

Explorer
The company operates a blockchain explorer that allows the user to see public cryptocurrency transactions and related information. This allows anyone who has a transaction's hash code to see the addresses of the wallets the transaction was sent from and received to, the amount of the transaction, and any fees. The tool can be used for analysis of transaction activity, cryptocurrency data, and analytics. The company sells advertising on the otherwise free service.

See also
 List of bitcoin companies

References

External links

Bitcoin companies
Tor onion services
Cryptocurrency tumblers
Financial services companies established in 2011
Computer-related introductions in 2011
Bitcoin exchanges